The Veterans Memorial Bridge, also known as the New Steubenville Bridge, is a cable-stayed bridge which carries U.S. Route 22 across the Ohio River between Steubenville, Ohio and Weirton, West Virginia. The bridge replaced the Fort Steuben Bridge, which was built in 1928.

History
Planning for the bridge began in 1961 in Ohio and in 1964 in West Virginia.  The bridge's construction was approved by the Federal Highway Administration in 1978. Construction began in 1979, and the bridge opened on May 1, 1990. The final cost of the bridge was $70 million.

Further reading 

 Veterans Memorial Bridge at Bridges & Tunnels

References

Road bridges in West Virginia
Weirton, West Virginia
Steubenville, Ohio
Monuments and memorials in West Virginia
Monuments and memorials in Ohio
Bridges completed in 1990
Cable-stayed bridges in the United States
Bridges over the Ohio River
Buildings and structures in Hancock County, West Virginia
Transportation in Hancock County, West Virginia
Buildings and structures in Jefferson County, Ohio
Transportation in Jefferson County, Ohio
Road bridges in Ohio
U.S. Route 22
Bridges of the United States Numbered Highway System
1990 establishments in Ohio
1990 establishments in West Virginia